Luke Robert Hemmings (born 16 July 1996) is an Australian singer and musician, best known for being the lead vocalist and rhythm guitarist of the pop rock band 5 Seconds of Summer. Since 2014, 5 Seconds of Summer have sold more than 10 million albums, sold over two million concert tickets worldwide, and the band's songs streams surpass 7 billion, making them one of the most successful Australian musical exports in history.

His debut studio album, When Facing the Things We Turn Away From, was released through Sony Music Australia on 13 August 2021. When Facing the Things We Turn Away From debuted atop the ARIA Albums Chart and peaked within the top 20 in Belgium and the United Kingdom.

Early life 
Hemmings was born on 16 July 1996, and raised in the Freemans Reach suburb of the Hawkesbury district in New South Wales. His father—Andrew Hemmings—was previously employed as a maintenance worker, while his mother—Liz Hemmings (née Pascoe)— is a former accountant turned high school mathematics teacher, now working in photography. Hemmings has two older brothers: Ben and Jack, both who previously worked as builders, with the latter now owning a street-wear clothing label. Hemmings has spoken on his working-class upbringing; elaborating: "[The band's] beginnings were so humble. [...] I grew up in a small house in the middle of nowhere". When he was 10 years old, Hemmings' brothers taught him how to play guitar, later prompting him to take professional lessons and learning from YouTube tutorial videos to learn how to play the instrument. Eventually, Hemmings began busking throughout his later childhood.

In Year 7, Hemmings switched schools, attending Norwest Christian College, where he met future band-mates, Calum Hood and Michael Clifford, later revealing that he initially disliked and was "enemies" with Clifford. Hemmings eventually befriended Hood after they performed a Secondhand Serenade cover at a school talent show, and later befriended Clifford after learning they had similar music taste.
Following the band's rise to fame, Hemmings continued with his high school education, opting to switch to distance learning. In 2013, he chose to not finish Year 12, the final year of secondary schooling in Australia, due to his commitment to the band.

Career

2011–present: 5 Seconds of Summer

In 2011, at the age of 14, Hemmings began posting YouTube song cover videos, under the username "hemmo1996". Hemmings' first video, a cover of Mike Posner's "Please Don't Go", was posted on 3 February 2011. As Hemmings' covers began gaining traction on the platform, he invited Hood and Clifford to join his videos. The trio eventually added mutual friend Ashton Irwin to their videos, forming the current 5 Seconds of Summer lineup.  Their first official gig was on December 3, 2011, at a bar in their hometown. After months of posting song covers together, the band began attracting interest from major music labels and publishers and signed a publishing deal with Sony/ATV Music Publishing. Hemmings has since released five studio albums with the band, each met with worldwide success: 5 Seconds of Summer (2014), Sounds Good Feels Good (2015), Youngblood (2018), Calm (2020) and 5SOS5 (2022).

Apart from the band, Hemmings has also pursued modelling. Hemmings, along with his band-mates, is currently signed to the celebrity division of Wilhelmina Models. In February 2019, Hemmings attended New York Fashion Week, debuting as a model and walking the runway for Philipp Plein's Autumn/Winter 2019 Ready-To-Wear collection. In July 2019, Hemmings starred in Numéro Homme's video editorial. In December 2019, Hemmings was featured as the cover model on the Winter 2019 issue of Glass Man magazine.

2021: Solo career: When Facing the Things We Turn Away From

In June 2021, Hemmings announced his debut solo album When Facing the Things We Turn Away From, which was released on 13 August 2021. The album was preceded by the singles "Starting Line", "Motion" and "Place in Me".

Personal life 
In 2015, Hemmings began an on-again off-again relationship with social media influencer Arzaylea Rodriguez. The couple ended their relationship in May 2017.

On 8 June 2021, Hemmings posted on his Instagram account announcing his engagement to his girlfriend of three years, Sierra Deaton. The couple currently lives together in Los Angeles.

As of 2020, Hemmings' net worth is estimated to be US$20 million.

Discography

Studio albums

Singles

Song credits

References

External links

 
 

1996 births
Living people
21st-century Australian male singers
21st-century Australian singers
Australian expatriates in the United States
Australian male guitarists
Australian male models
Australian male singer-songwriters
Australian pop singers
Australian rock guitarists
Australian rock singers
People from the Central Coast (New South Wales)
Rhythm guitarists